The Jingchuan Formation is a Barremian geologic formation in China. Various dinosaur fossils and tracks have been reported from the formation.

Vertebrate paleofauna 
 Wuerhosaurus
 Psittacosaurus
 Sinornithoides
 Hadrosauridae indet. fragmentary fossils
 Sauropod indet. footprints
 Theropod indet. footprints

See also 
 List of dinosaur-bearing rock formations
 List of stratigraphic units with theropod tracks

References

Bibliography 
 Weishampel, David B.; Dodson, Peter; and Osmólska, Halszka (eds.): The Dinosauria, 2nd, Berkeley: University of California Press. 861 pp. .
 Lockley, Martin G.; Li, Jianjun; Xing, Lida; Gao, Bin; and Matsukawa, Masaki: Cretaceous Research, "Large theropod and small sauropod trackmakers from the Lower Cretaceous Jingchuan Formation, Inner Mongolia, China", vol 91: University of Colorado at Denver. doi: https://doi.org/10.1016/j.cretres.2018.07.007

Geologic formations of China
Lower Cretaceous Series of Asia
Cretaceous China
Barremian Stage
Sandstone formations
Mudstone formations
Fluvial deposits
Lacustrine deposits
Ichnofossiliferous formations
Fossiliferous stratigraphic units of Asia
Paleontology in Inner Mongolia